A Woman Like Eve is a 1979 Dutch drama film about a woman who leaves her husband for another woman. The film was directed by Nouchka van Brakel; Monique van de Ven stars in the title role of Eve, with Peter Faber as her husband Ad and Maria Schneider as Liliane, who becomes Eve's lover. The plot focuses on the child custody battle that ensues after Eve leaves her husband.

The film had festival showings at FILMEX: Los Angeles International Film Exposition (Contemporary Cinema) (1980); San Francisco International Gay Film Festival (1981), and Gay & Lesbian Media Coalition's "Out on the Screen" Festival (1992). The film was selected as the Dutch entry for the Best Foreign Language Film at the 52nd Academy Awards, but was not accepted as a nominee.

Cast
 Monique van de Ven as Eve
 Maria Schneider as Liliane
 Marijke Merckens as Sonja
 Peter Faber as Ad
 Renée Soutendijk as Sigrid
 Anna Knaup as Britta
 Mike Bendig as Sander
 Truus Dekker as Mom
 Helen van Meurs as Lawyer

See also
 List of submissions to the 52nd Academy Awards for Best Foreign Language Film
 List of Dutch submissions for the Academy Award for Best Foreign Language Film

References

External links
 
 Lisa DiCaprio, Lianna: Liberal Lesbianism, Jump Cut, no. 29, February 1984, pp. 45–47. Contrasts A Woman Like Eve to John Sayles's film Lianna.

1979 films
1979 drama films
Dutch LGBT-related films
Female bisexuality in film
Lesbian-related films
Films set in the Netherlands
1979 LGBT-related films
LGBT-related drama films
Dutch drama films
1970s Dutch-language films
Films directed by Nouchka van Brakel